The third season of The Masked Singer Brasil premiered on January 22, 2023, on TV Globo, following a sneak peek episode that aired on January 15.

Hosts and panelists
Ivete Sangalo returned for her third season as the main host, alongside Priscilla Alcantara who returned for her second season as the show's backstage host.

Eduardo Sterblitch and Taís Araújo returned for their third season as panelists, while Tatá Werneck and Rodrigo Lombardi were unable to return due to other commitments.

On November 30, 2022, it was announced that TV host Sabrina Sato would join the series as a new panelist and Tatá Werneck's replacement. Actor Mateus Solano was revealed as Rodrigo Lombardi's replacement at the panel on December 13, 2022.

Guest panelists

Contestants

Episodes

Week 1 (January 22)

Week 2 (January 29)

Week 3 (February 5)

Week 4 (February 12)

Week 5 (February 19)
 Theme: Carnival Duets

 After being unmasked, Emanuelle and Tatau sang "Tá Escrito" from Grupo Revelação as their encore performance.

Week 6 (February 26)
 Theme: Telenovelas

Week 7 (March 5)

Week 8 (March 12)

Week 9 (March 19)
 Theme: Eduardo Sterblitch's Dance Challenge

Week 10 (March 26)

Week 11 (April 2)

Week 12 (April 9)

Ratings and reception

Brazilian ratings
All numbers are in points and provided by Kantar Ibope Media.

References

External links
Official website on Gshow.com

3
2023 Brazilian television seasons